"Thinking About You" is the fifth single by American singer Whitney Houston. It was written by Kashif Saleem and La Forrest "La La" Cope for Houston's debut studio album Whitney Houston (1985), while production was helmed by the former, released in October 1985. Even though it was not promoted as a single to top 40 radio stations, "Thinking About You" became a top 10 hit on the Hot Black Singles chart in the United States. It later appeared as the B-side to Houston's 1986 single, "Greatest Love of All".

Chart performance
The song debuted at number 76 on the Hot Black Singles chart on October 19, 1985. On December 14, 1985, the song reached its peak position of number 10. It spent 15 weeks on the chart.

Critical reception
AllMusic editor Stephen Thomas Erlewine called the track "unheralded" and one of the lighter songs on the album, as well as "a dance/R&B hit [...] that remains one of Whitney's purest pop pleasures".

Track listings and formats 

US 7" Vinyl Single
A "Thinking About You" – 5:24
B "Someone for Me" – 4:58
US 12" Vinyl Maxi-Single
A "Thinking About You" (Extended Dance Version) – 7:19
B1 "Thinking About You" (Single Version) – 4:03
B2 "Thinking About You" (Dub Version) – 8:04

UK 12" Vinyl Single
A "Thinking About You" (Club Side) – 5:24
B "You Give Good Love" (Radio Side) – 4:33

Credits and personnel

"Thinking About You"
Kashif – writer, producer
La La – writer
Bruce Forest – remix producer
Michael Hutchinson – engineer 

"Someone for Me"
Freddie Washington – writer
Raymond Jones – writer
Jermaine Jackson – producer
Bill Schnee – mixer

Charts

References

1985 songs
1985 singles
Whitney Houston songs
Arista Records singles
Songs written by Kashif (musician)
Songs written by La Forrest 'La La' Cope
Funk songs
Post-disco songs
Contemporary R&B songs